The Saints Peter and Paul Church in Chisholm, Minnesota is a former Ukrainian Catholic church building.  It was built in 1916 by a congregation of Ukrainian immigrants.  The church was listed on the National Register of Historic Places as Saints Peter and Paul Church–Ukrainian Catholic in 1980 for its local significance in the themes of religion and social history.  It was nominated for its role in anchoring its community of Ukrainian Americans, the final ethnic group to arrive on the Iron Range during its turn-of-the-20th-century immigration influx.

See also
 List of Catholic churches in the United States
 National Register of Historic Places listings in St. Louis County, Minnesota

References

1916 establishments in Minnesota
Churches completed in 1916
Churches in St. Louis County, Minnesota
Churches on the National Register of Historic Places in Minnesota
Former churches in Minnesota
National Register of Historic Places in St. Louis County, Minnesota
Ukrainian-American culture in Minnesota
Ukrainian Catholic churches in the United States